George Ndung'u Mwicigi (1932/33–4 March 2016) was a Kenyan member of parliament representing Kandara Constituency in Murang'a County.

References

1930s births
2016 deaths